Tih Minh is a 1918 French film serial directed by Louis Feuillade.

Plot
Tih Minh tells the story of Jacques d'Athys who returns to his home in Nice after an expedition to Indochina.  Tih Minh (Mary Harald), a young woman from Laos, accompanies him.

Athys and his servant, Placide, soon become involved with an international band of jewel thieves-cum-spies that include among its members a mysterious noble person, a hypnotist and an evil doctor who renders their victims amnesiacs.

Unknown to Athys, he has returned to France with a book that contains a coded message revealing the location of treasure and sensitive government intelligence.  This makes him and Tih Minh the target of the spies who will stop at nothing to obtain the book.

Cast
 Mary Harald (fr) as Tih Minh
 René Cresté as Jacques d'Athys
 Georges Biscot as Placido
 Édouard Mathé as Sir Francis Grey
 Louis Leubas (fr) as Kistna
 Gaston Michel as Dr. Gilson
 Marcel Marquet as Dr. Clauzel (as Marquet)
 Émile André as Dr. Davesnes
 Georgette Faraboni  (fr) as La marquise Dolorès
 Jeanne Rollette as Rosette
 Lugane as Jane d'Athys
 Madame Lacroix as Mme d'Athys

Reception
Tih Minh was edited and released in 1920 in the United States under the title In the Clutches of the Hindu. However, when compared to American film serials, its European-style pace of action was considered to be slow, and it would be the last European serial to be distributed in the American film serial format.

See also
 List of film serials
 List of film serials by studio

References

External links

1918 films
French silent feature films
Film serials
Films directed by Louis Feuillade
French black-and-white films
1910s French films